The 2014 Afghan Premier League is the third season of Afghan Premier League, the Afghan league for association football clubs, since its establishment in 2012. The season started on 28 August 2014 with the group stage. Shaheen Asmayee enters the season as the defending champions, having defeated Simorgh Alborz 3–1 in the 2013 final. It was Shaheen's first title and championship, with Simorgh's second runner up title, after two seasons in a row making it to the final of the country's league football.

Teams
A total of eight teams compete in the league, divided into two groups of four in the 18 game total league. There is no promotion or relegation system for the league.

Teams and locations

Group stage

Group A

Group B

Knockout stage

Semi-finals

Consolation

Final

Top scorers
As of 3 October 2014.

References

Afghan Premier League seasons
1
Afghan
Afghan